The CFTR inhibitory factor (Cif) is a protein virulence factor secreted by the Gram-negative bacteria Pseudomonas aeruginosa and Acinetobacter nosocomialis.  Discovered at Dartmouth Medical School, Cif is able to alter the trafficking of select ABC transporters in eukaryotic epithelial cells, such as the cystic fibrosis transmembrane conductance regulator (CFTR), and P-glycoprotein by interfering with the host deubiquitinating machinery. By promoting the ubiquitin-mediated degradation of CFTR, Cif is able to phenocopy cystic fibrosis at the cellular level.  The cif gene is transcribed as part of a 3 gene operon, whose expression is negatively regulated by CifR, a TetR family repressor.

Cellular mechanism of action 
Cif was first discovered by co-culturing P. aeruginosa with human airway epithelial cells and monitoring the resulting effect on chloride ion efflux across a polarized monolayer.  After co-culture, the CFTR specific chloride ion efflux was found to be drastically reduced. This was determined to be caused by reduced levels of CFTR at the apical surface of these cells.  This effect was later found to be the result of a single secreted protein produced by P. aeruginosa, which was named the CFTR inhibitory factor for this initial phenotype.  Cif is secreted by P. aeruginosa PA14 as soluble protein as well as packaged into outer membrane vesicles (OMV).  Cif is far more potent when applied in OMVs, likely due to efficiency of delivery.  Purified, recombinant Cif protein can be applied to polarized monolayers of mammalian cells and promote the removal of CFTR and P-glycoprotein from the apical membrane.  Cif accomplishes this by interfering with the host deubiquitylation system.

Epoxide hydrolase enzyme mechanism 

Cif is an epoxide hydrolase (EH) with unique substrate selectivity.  Cif is the first example of an EH serving as a virulence factor. Based on structural comparison, it appears that the enzyme utilizes a catalytic triad of residues Asp129, Glu153 and His297, with accessory residues His177 and Tyr239 coordinating the epoxide oxygen during ring opening.  Cif is also the first example of an EH utilizing a His-Tyr pair to coordinate an epoxide substrate, rather than the canonical Tyr-Tyr pair. In the proposed enzyme mechanism, Asp129 nucleophilically attacks a carbon of the epoxide moiety of a substrate, forming an ester linked enzyme-acyl intermediate. The preference for which carbon is attacked varies depending upon the substrate. In the second step of the reaction, a water molecule is activated by the charge-relay His297-Glu153 pair, and undergoes nucleophilic attack on the Cγ of Asp129. This hydrolyzes the ester group, liberating the hydrolysis product as a vicinal diol.

Structure 
Cif belongs to the α/β hydrolase family of proteins.  Its structure was determined by X-ray crystallography and consists of the canonical α/β hydrolase fold with a cap domain, which it uses to constitutively homo-dimerize in solution.  The active site is buried in the interior of the protein at the interface between the α/β hydrolase core and the cap.

References 

Virulence factors
Cystic fibrosis